The National Weather Service operates 122 weather forecast offices in six regions. Each weather forecast office (WFO or NWSFO) has a geographic area of responsibility, also known as a county warning area, for issuing local public, marine, aviation, fire, and hydrology forecasts. They also issue severe weather warnings, gather weather observations, and daily and monthly climate data for their assigned area. The local weather forecast offices also control the broadcasts of weather information on the NOAA Weather Radio All Hazards stations. The NWS is divided into six regions.

History
Prior to the NWS reorganization in the 1990s, each state and territory had its own forecast office — with the exception of northern and southern California; north, south, and west Texas; and upper and lower New England.  Local offices (NWSOs) then each maintained their own county warning area, and the official hourly and daily readings at the weather station where they were located, typically at a regional airport in a smaller city.

During the reorganization, many of these became forecast offices, while most were closed in favor of cheaper automatic weather stations like AWOS and ASOS.  Since then, many offices and weather radars have moved to separate non-airport locations, where they are assigned new location identifiers, such as EYW/KEYW to KEY/KKEY for NWSFO Key West, and BHM/KBHM to BMX/KBMX for Birmingham radar.

Forecast offices

Alaska Region (3 offices)

Central Region (38 offices)

Eastern Region (23 offices)

Pacific Region (2 offices)

Southern Region (32 offices)

Western Region (24 offices)

An interactive map of all six regions with links to individual WFOs can be found here: https://www.weather.gov/srh/nwsoffices

References

National Weather Service